Joan Astley may refer to:

 Joan Bright Astley (1910–2008)
Jane Meutas (1510s–1550s), Jane or Joan, maiden name Astley, lady-in-waiting